Manihiki is a Cook Islands electoral division returning one member to the Cook Islands Parliament.  Its current representative is Henry Puna, who has held the seat since 2010.

The electorate consists of the island of Manihiki.

Members of Parliament for Manihiki
Unless otherwise stated, all MPs terms began and ended at general elections.

Election results

2006 election

2005 Byelection

2004 election

References

Manihiki
Cook Islands electorates